Maung Maung Latt (born 25 November 1966) is a Burmese politician and currently serves as Amyotha Hluttaw MP for Sagaing Region № 9 constituency. He is a member of the National League for Democracy.

Early life and career
Maung Maung Latt was born on 25 November 1966vin Tamu Township, Myanmar. He graduated with B.Sc (Hons) from Monywa Collage in 1987 and  M.Sc (Thesis) Zoology from Mandalay University in 1994.

From 1995 to 3004, he worked as a tuition teacher in Tamu Township. He has given a free education to more than 200 students from 1995 to present. He wrote poems in translate English at The Light Of English magazines by his pen named Maung Maung Latt 3D. He had been written translate articles at Nwe Ni magazine, The New Style magazine and The International Magazine by his pen named Maung Maung Zaw Latt 3D Ko Latt (Gaung Htoo San).

Political career
He is a member of the National League for Democracy. In the 2015 Myanmar general election, he was elected as an Amyotha Hluttaw MP and elected representative from Sagaing Region № 9 parliamentary constituency.

References

Living people
1966 births
National League for Democracy politicians
People from Sagaing Region
Mandalay University alumni